Hubert Deutsch (3 May 1925 - 16 June 2018) was an Austrian conductor and administrator closely connected to the Vienna State Opera.

References

External links
Vienna State Opera, Geburtstag: Hubert Deutsch 

Opera managers
Austrian conductors (music)
Male conductors (music)
1925 births
2018 deaths